Ahmad Shukri bin Abdul Shukur is a Malaysian politician that has participated in several general election in Malaysia. He was the Member of Parliament for Padang Terap from 1974 to 1978 and the Member of Kedah State Legislative Assembly for Sala from 1969 to 1974.

Political career 
He was the member of Kedah State Legislative Assembly for Sala from 1969 to 1974 after winning the 1969 Malaysian general election representing Malaysian Islamic Party. In 1964 Malaysian general election, he lost to Mahathir Mohamad, representing UMNO for the Kota Star Selatan parliamentary seat. He was also a member of Dewan Rakyat after winning the Padang Terap parliamentary seat in 1974 Malaysian general election, representing PAS, which used the logo of Barisan Nasional.

In July 1983, after PAS had failed to win back Kelantan, Ahmad Shukri followed the former PAS president, Asri Muda to establish a new party, Parti Hizbul Muslimin Malaysia. He was appointed as the Deputy President, the Spokesperson of Kedah and the Chairman of the Disciplinary Committee of the party.

See also 

 Parti Hizbul Muslimin Malaysia
 Padang Terap (federal constituency)

Reference 

Members of the Kedah State Legislative Assembly